ARA Spiro (P-43) is the third ship of the MEKO 140A16  of six corvettes built for the Argentine Navy. The ship is the second ship to bear the name of the Greek-born Captain Samuel Spiro, who fought during the Argentine War of Independence and blew himself up with his ship rather than surrender to the Spanish forces following the battle of Arroyo de la China, in 1814.

She is homeported at Puerto Belgrano Naval Base and is part of the Navy's 2nd Corvette Division with her five sister ships.

Construction

Spiro and her sister ships were part of the 1974 Naval Constructions National Plan, an initiative by the Argentine Navy to replace old World War II-vintage ships with more advanced warships. The original plan called for six MEKO 360H2 destroyers, four of them to be built in Argentina, but the plan was later modified to include four MEKO destroyers and six corvettes for anti-surface warfare and patrol operations.

Spiro was constructed at the Río Santiago Shipyard of the Astilleros y Fábricas Navales del Estado (State Shipyards and Naval Factories) state corporation. Her keel was laid down on 2 October 1982, and was launched on 24 June 1983. The ship was officially delivered to the Navy on 26 November 1987, and formally commissioned on 9 May 1988.

Service history

On 25 September 1990, Spiro and the destroyer  participated as part of a multinational task force in the United Nations-mandated blockade of Iraq following its invasion of Kuwait. She participated in patrol and escort missions as part of Operations Desert Shield and Desert Storm, returning to Argentina on 30 May 1991.

Spiro also participated in several naval exercises and conducted fishery patrol duties in the Argentine exclusive economic zone, capturing three illegal fishing ships between 1991 and 1994.

In August 2012 she ran aground on a sandbank as she left Mar del Plata and lost her sonar. This meant that her sister  had to make an unscheduled deployment to replace Spiro on the Atlasur IX exercise off West Africa. Having left port with unresolved problems in her generators, Espora ended up spending 73 days in South Africa after three generators failed completely and Argentina struggled to find the money to repair them.

In 2021, Spiro was reported active and, in September, participated in a sea exercise also involving her sister ships Espora, Robinson and Gómez Roca, along with the destroyer Sarandí.

References

Bibliography
 Guia de los buques de la Armada Argentina 2005-2006. Ignacio Amendolara Bourdette, Editor n/a. (Spanish/English text)

Espora-class corvettes
Ships built in Argentina
1982 ships
Gulf War ships of Argentina
Corvettes of Argentina
Maritime incidents in 2012